Kata Kondricz (born 16 July 1998) is a Hungarian foil fencer. She competed in the women's foil event at the 2020 Summer Olympics in Tokyo, Japan.

She competed at the 2022 European Fencing Championships held in Antalya, Turkey.

References

External links 
 

Living people
1998 births
Place of birth missing (living people)
Hungarian female foil fencers
Fencers at the 2020 Summer Olympics
Olympic fencers of Hungary
21st-century Hungarian women